Maximilian Joseph Franz of Oer (1806–1846) was a German author, baron, and older brother of the notable artist Theobald von Oer.

1806 births
1846 deaths

Barons of the Holy Roman Empire
Barons Oer
German male writers